M. P. Nachimuthu Mudaliyar (28 March 1913 – 27 June 1987) was a Padma Shri award winner in 1983 for his social work in the hand loom field. He was the founder of Chentex Hand Looms in Chennimalai.

An Engineering College is constructed in Chennimalai with his name by J. Sudhanandhen.

References

1913 births
1987 deaths
Recipients of the Padma Shri in social work
Social workers
20th-century Indian educators
Social workers from Tamil Nadu
People from Erode district